G. Schirmer, Inc. is an American classical music publishing company based in New York City, founded in 1861. The oldest active music publisher in the United States, Schirmer publishes sheet music for sale and rental, and represents some well-known European music publishers in North America, such as the Music Sales Affiliates ChesterNovello, Breitkopf & Härtel, Sikorski and many Russian and former Soviet composers' catalogs.

History
The company was founded in 1861 in the United States by German-born Gustav Schirmer Sr. (1829–1893), the son of a German immigrant.  In 1891, the company established its own engraving and printing plant.  The next year it inaugurated the Schirmer's Library of Musical Classics.  The Musical Quarterly, the oldest academic journal on music in the U.S., was founded by Schirmer in 1915 together with musicologist Oscar Sonneck, who edited the journal until his death in 1928.  In 1964, Schirmer acquired Associated Music Publishers (BMI) which had built up an important catalog of American composers including Elliott Carter, Henry Cowell, Roy Harris, Charles Ives, Walter Piston, and William Schuman, adding to a Schirmer's ASCAP roster which had already included Samuel Barber, Leonard Bernstein, Morton Gould, Gian Carlo Menotti, and Virgil Thomson, as well as composers from the earlier part of the century such as Charles Tomlinson Griffes, Charles Martin Loeffler, John Alden Carpenter, and Percy Grainger.

The company was owned by the Schirmer family for over 100 years until Macmillan, a major book publisher, purchased it in 1968.  Macmillan then sold G. Schirmer (except for its reference division, now part of Cengage Learning) to its current owner, Robert Wise, in 1986, the owner of popular music publisher, Music Sales Group, Inc. According to a spokesman, the purchase price was around US$7 million. The Music Sales Group changed its name to Wise Music Group in February 2020.

As the sale of Schirmer did not include The Musical Quarterly, the future of the journal remained uncertain until its transition in 1989 to publisher Oxford University Press. In 1986 Schirmer also joined with the Hal Leonard Corporation, a print distributor of jazz and popular music, who became the sole distributors of Schirmer's printed music.  The last member of the family named for the founder was Gus Schirmer the 4th, a theatrical director, producer, and agent, who died in 1992 at the age of 73.

Composers published by the company
The Schirmer/AMP catalog includes composers such as John Corigliano, Richard Danielpour, Avner Dorman, Gabriela Lena Frank, John Harbison, Aaron Jay Kernis, Leon Kirchner, Peter Lieberson, André Previn, Bright Sheng, Fannie Morris Spencer, Tan Dun, Augusto Brandt, Du Yun, Robert Xavier Rodriguez, Joan Tower, Margaret Shelley Vance, Mabel Madison Watson, and Mary Wiggins.

The company also publishes The G. Schirmer Manual of Style and Usage.  G. Schirmer is a member of the Music Sales Group of Companies, the Music Publishers Association, the National Music Publishers Association, and the Church Music Publishers Association.

References

External links
Schirmer.com, official homepage
ArtistsHouseMusic.org (interview with Peggy Monastra on G. Schirmer Music Publishers)
 (publisher page)

Schirmer
Schirmer
Schirmer
Publishing companies established in 1861
1861 establishments in New York (state)
1968 mergers and acquisitions
1986 mergers and acquisitions